Barrobo District is a district of Liberia, one of the three located in Maryland County.

Barrobo is the largest of the various Grebo sub-tribes in Maryland County, Republic of Liberia.  In the days of tribal wars they fought surrounding tribes to secure a large portion of land. Their military strength in those days enabled them to wipe out the entire tribe of Gbaylo. The land previously occupied by the Gbaylo tribe is currently a property of the Barrobo people. To control their warlike nature, President Edwin Barclay of Liberia built a military barak among them. The soldiers  of Camp King used suppression, hard labor and intimidation to keep them in check.  Besides, they were subjected to smaller tribes in the administrative arrangement of the Liberian central government. First, they were part of the Webbo district. When Grand Gedeh county was established and Webbo became part of Grand Gedeh, the Barrobo tribe was subjected to the smaller tribe of Boah. The most prominent paramount chiefs during the chieftaincy period were Peter Brooks of Feloken and Sunday Karmanue of Rock Town. On September 18, 1980, the Liberian legislature passed an act creating Barrobo as a statutory district, with Paramount Chief John Togba becoming the first district superintendent. Since then, September 18 has been celebrated annually  by the citizens of the district. , the superintendents of Barrobo since it became a district have been:
 John Togba19801981
 Ralph Clark19811986
 Fred D. Goe, Sr19861990
 None (a period of civil war and anarchy)19901997
 Joseph WeahJanuaryApril 1997
 Victor Carngbe19972005
 William B. Nagbe20052010
 Samuel Sorwleh20102012
 George Geefiefrom 2012

Districts of Barrobo:
 Nyonken  District 
 Gwlekpokeh District 
 Whojah District 

Among the prominent citizens of Barrobo Statutory District are the following: Hon. Paul Jeffie, former Governor of the National Bank of Liberia; Honorable Harry Carngbe, former member of the House of Representatives (representing lower Grand Gedeh County) during the administration of President William V. S. Tubman; Honorable J. Barney Taylor, former Senator of Maryland County during the administration of President Samuel K. Doe; Rev. Dr. Jimmy B. Kuoh, Former General Superintendent of the Assemblies of God of Liberia; Hon. Samuel Tweah, Minister of Finance; Hon. J. Tiah Nagbe, Director of Liberia National Identification Registry; Hon. Betsy Kuoh Toe, former Superintendent of Maryland County; and Hon. William K. Godfrey, former Deputy Minister of Justice.

Districts of Liberia
Maryland County